Faridabad NIT Assembly constituency is one of the 90 constituencies in the Haryana Legislative Assembly of Haryana a north state of India. Faridabad NIT is also part of Faridabad Lok Sabha constituency.

Members of Legislative Assembly

Election results

2020

See also

 Faridabad
 Faridabad district
 List of constituencies of Haryana Legislative Assembly

References

Assembly constituencies of Haryana
Faridabad district
Faridabad